John Morris  is an American voice actor. He is best known for his role as the voice of Andy Davis in the Toy Story films.

Early life
John Morris graduated from the San Francisco University High School in San Francisco, California in 2003.

Career
In 1991 while auditioning for the role of Andy in Toy Story, Morris brought some of his X-Men action figures and made voices for them; the Pixar staff loved it and gave him the part. Morris was brought back on to Toy Story 3 by the request of the director Lee Unkrich. On the Toy Story 3 Blu-ray/DVD, Unkrich elaborated that they first had to seek out contact information for Morris, then there was a growing concern over whether his voice would sound right - fears that were relieved when Unkrich first called Morris and heard his voicemail greeting.

He also has minor fame for voicing "Pepper Roni" in the 1997 video game Lego Island.

Personal life
A 2007 graduate from the University of California-Los Angeles School of Theater, Film & Television, Morris resides in Northern California.

Filmography

References

External links
 
 

1984 births
Male actors from Dallas
Living people
American male child actors
American male film actors
American male voice actors
UCLA Film School alumni
People from Paris, Texas
Place of birth missing (living people)
20th-century American male actors
21st-century American male actors